Recophora is a genus of moths of the family Noctuidae. The genus was described by Nye in 1975.

Species
 Recophora canteneri (Duponchel, 1833)
 Recophora beata (Staudinger, 1892)
 Recophora hreblayi Hacker & Ronkay, 2002

References
 Genus info and images

Noctuidae